Cylapus is a genus of plant bugs in the family Miridae. There are about 12 described species in Cylapus.

Species
These 12 species belong to the genus Cylapus:

 Cylapus brasiliensis Carvalho, 1986
 Cylapus citus Bergroth, 1922
 Cylapus clavicornis Poppius, 1909
 Cylapus famularis (Stål, 1862)
 Cylapus festinabundus Bergroth, 1922
 Cylapus funebris (Distant, 1883)
 Cylapus marginicollis (Distant, 1883)
 Cylapus nobilis Poppius, 1909
 Cylapus ruficeps Bergroth, 1922
 Cylapus stellatus (Distant, 1883)
 Cylapus striatus Reuter, 1907
 Cylapus tenuicornis (Say, 1832)

References

Further reading

External links

 

Cylapinae
Articles created by Qbugbot